Ovalene is a polycyclic aromatic hydrocarbon with the formula C32H14, which consists of ten peri-fused six-membered rings. It is very similar to coronene.

Ovalene is a reddish-orange compound. It is sparingly soluble in solvents such as benzene, toluene, and dichloromethane. Its solutions have a green fluorescence under UV light.

Ovalene has been shown to form in deep-sea hydrothermal vent areas and in the hydrocracking process of petroleum refining.

References

External links
 Ovalene datapage at NIST

Polycyclic aromatic hydrocarbons